The Sound of Sunshine is the third studio album by the American funk and disco group The Sunshine Band. The album was produced by its vocalist Harry Wayne Casey, who did not perform vocals for the album, and Richard Finch. It was released in September 1975 on the TK label.

History
The Sound of Sunshine, an instrumental album, was credited only to the Sunshine Band. Singer Harry Wayne Casey ("KC") did not perform on it as a vocalist, though he co-produced with partner Richard Finch. The album features an instrumental version of "Rock Your Baby", which had been a hit for George McCrae in 1974.

Track listing

Personnel
Harry Wayne Casey – keyboards, vocal
Jerome Smith – guitar
Richard Finch – bass guitar, drum, percussion
Robert Johnson – drum
Fermin Goytisolo – percussion
Ken Faulk – trumpet
Vinnie Tanno – trumpet
Mike Lewis – tenor saxophone
Whit Sidener – baritone saxophone
Beverly Champion – background vocals
Margaret Reynolds – background vocals
Jeanette Williams – background vocals

Additional personnel
Larry Warmoth – album photography

References

External links
 The Sound of Sunshine at Discogs

KC and the Sunshine Band albums
1975 albums
TK Records albums